Vriesea splendens, or flaming sword, is a species of flowering plant in the family Bromeliaceae, subfamily Tillandsioideae.  Native to Trinidad, eastern Venezuela and the Guianas these plants were introduced to Europe in 1840.  This species of Vriesea features smooth-margined foliage with brown bands growing in a rosette, usually producing a bright red inflorescence in a flattened spike. It is a recipient of the Royal Horticultural Society's Award of Garden Merit.

It is sometimes considered a synonym of Lutheria splendens.

The Bromeliad Cultivar Register lists a number of cultivars of V. splendens.

References

External links
FCBS Vriesea link

splendens
House plants
Flora of South America
Flora of Trinidad and Tobago
Epiphytes
Plants described in 1845